Amerigo Castrighella is an Italian actor. He played 2nd Sombrero Onlooker at Tuco's 1st Hanging in The Good, the Bad and the Ugly (1966), and the executioner in Mark of Zorro (1975). He also appeared in Anything for a Friend (1973), and And They Smelled the Strange, Exciting, Dangerous Scent of Dollars (1973).

Filmography

References

External links
 

Date of birth unknown
20th-century Italian male actors
Italian male film actors
Male Spaghetti Western actors